Huchel is a German language surname. It stems from the male given name Hugo – and may refer to:
Alexander Huchel, former German curler
Peter Huchel (1903–1981), German poet and editor

References 

German-language surnames
Surnames from given names